Tanjung Dua Belas is a mukim (commune/subdistrict) and a small village in Kuala Langat District, Selangor, Malaysia.

Kuala Langat District
Mukims of Selangor